Eduardo Pereira Martínez  (born 21 March 1954) is a retired Uruguayan footballer who played as a goalkeeper.

International career
Pereira made ten appearances for the senior Uruguay national football team from 1987 to 1990, including four 1990 FIFA World Cup qualifiers.

References

 

1954 births
Living people
Uruguayan footballers
Uruguayan expatriate footballers
Uruguay international footballers
1987 Copa América players
1990 FIFA World Cup players
Uruguayan Primera División players
Argentine Primera División players
Peñarol players
Montevideo Wanderers F.C. players
Liverpool F.C. (Montevideo) players
Club Guaraní players
UD Salamanca players
RCD Espanyol footballers
CE Sabadell FC footballers
Club Atlético Independiente footballers
Expatriate footballers in Argentina
Expatriate footballers in Paraguay
Expatriate footballers in Spain
Footballers from Montevideo
Copa América-winning players
Association football goalkeepers